Monisha En Monalisa is a 1999 Indian Tamil-language romance film written, directed and produced by T. Rajendar who also composed the music and portrays a supporting role as a philosopher, Kaadhaldasan. The actors Ramankanth (Raman Trikha) and Mumtaj made their debuts in this film. T. Rajendar's sons, Silambarasan and Kuralarasan, appear in the opening song of the film, "Monisha", sung by the former. The film released on 12 April 1999 and became a box-office disaster.

Plot 
Rahul (Ramankanth) lives a miserable existence – he is ill-treated by his superficial step-mother (Sharmila's aunt), and largely ignored by his meek father. His world brightens when he attends pop singer Monisha's (Mumtaj) concert. He falls in love with her and pursues her by wooing her over the phone. Monisha, who hates men and the concept of love itself, initially resists his advances. However, his relentless efforts bear fruit and she agrees to meet him in person. Tragedy strikes when Rahul meets with an accident on the way over and dies. The movie hinges on whether Monisha will ever get to meet her lover.

Cast 

Raman Trikha as Rahul (credited as Ramankanth)
Mumtaj as Monisha
T. Rajendar as Kaadhaldasan (director)
Meenal Pendse as Sharmila
Deepshika as Shalini, Monisha's PA and friend
Vadivelu
Ravi Kishan as Ravi
Hemant Pandey
Kalpana Iyer
Vennira Aadai Moorthy as Monisha's doctor
Balasaravanan
Silambarasan in a song appearance
Kuralarasan in a song appearance

Production 
The song Tholaipesi Enna was shot at a grand budget of 10 million, but the film had troubles after floods in Chennai washed away a set erected on the banks of the Cooum. During the production of the film, the film was renamed from Monisha to Monisha En Monalisa due to astrological reasons. The film had begun production as a trilingual in Tamil, Hindi and Telugu, and Rajender cast local actors for the Hindi version. Hindi television actor Raman Trikha was renamed Ramankanth for the Tamil version, while actors including Rahul Saxena, Ravi Kiran, Kunika, and Kalpana Iyer were signed to play roles.

Soundtrack 
Soundtrack was written and composed by T. Rajendar. The title song of the film is based on "María" by Ricky Martin. HMV (now known as Saregama) bought the audio rights of the film and they said to have sold over three lakhs of cassettes within first round.
Tamil version
"College Irukkutha" – Mano, Swarnalatha
"Don't Try To Love Me" – Anuradha Sriram
"Ilamaiye" – Anuradha Sriram
"Hello Hello" – SPB, Sujatha
"No Problem" – Suresh Peters
"Kaadhale Kaadhale" – P. Unnikrishnan
"Nambathe" – T. Rajendar
"Monisha" – Silambarasan
"Mo Mo Monisha" – Silambarasan
"Monalisa Monalisa" – Silambarasan
"Uyire Vaa Urave Vaa" – Hariharan
"Kaadhal Thedi" – SPB

Hindi version
Hindi soundtrack released under the name Yehi To Pyar Mein.
Kuwara Kuwara - Sukhwinder Singh 
Monalisa Monalisa - Tr Silambarasan
Monisha - Silambarasan
Chahatein Ga Rahi Hai - Hariharan 
No Problem - Bali Brahmbhatt 
Don't Try To Love Me - Kavita Krishnamurthy 
Yeh Meri Jawaniyan - Poornima 
Preetam Ne Aas Lagayee - S. P. Balasubrahmanyam 
Hello Hello - SPB, Sujatha 
College Kahan Hai - Suchitra Krishnamoorthi, SPB

Release 
The film released on 12 April 1999. It received primarily poor reviews upon release, with one reviewer labelling it the "low point of Tamil cinema." Kalki called it a "unbeleivable, tiring, cliched love story". The film was also made in Hindi as Yehi To Pyaar Hai which remains unreleased even though its soundtrack was released.

References

External links 

1990s romance films
1990s Tamil-language films
1999 films
Films directed by T. Rajendar
Films scored by T. Rajendar
Films with screenplays by T. Rajendar
Indian romance films